Matías de Andrade (born 22 April 1993) is an Argentine Paralympic swimmer who specialises in backstroke swimming and competes in international elite events. He is a two-time World medalist and a Parapan American Games champion.

De Andrade has competed at the 2012 and 2016 Summer Paralympics, and is qualified to compete at the 2020 Summer Paralympics.

References

1993 births
Living people
Sportspeople from Mar del Plata
Paralympic swimmers of Argentina
Argentine male backstroke swimmers
Swimmers at the 2012 Summer Paralympics
Swimmers at the 2016 Summer Paralympics
Swimmers at the 2020 Summer Paralympics
Medalists at the 2011 Parapan American Games
Medalists at the 2015 Parapan American Games
Medalists at the 2019 Parapan American Games
Medalists at the World Para Swimming Championships
Medalists at the 2020 Summer Paralympics
Paralympic medalists in swimming
Paralympic silver medalists for Argentina
S6-classified Paralympic swimmers